The 1950 LSU Tigers football team was an American football team that represented  Louisiana State University (LSU) as a member of the Southeastern Conference (SEC) during the 1950 college football season. In their third year under head coach Gaynell Tinsley, the team compiled an overall record of 4–5–2, with a mark of 2–3–2 in conference play, placing ninth in the SEC.

Schedule

References

LSU
LSU Tigers football seasons
LSU Tigers football